Zach Hudson is an American educator and politician serving as a member of the Oregon House of Representatives from the 49th district. Elected in 2020, he assumed office on January 11, 2021

Early life and education 
Hudson was born and raised in Oregon. He earned a Bachelor of Arts and Master of Arts from the University of Winchester in Hampshire, England. He then earned a Master of Education from Portland State University. He received teaching credentials and certificates from California State University, Fullerton and Lewis & Clark College.

Career 
In 2004 and 2005, Hudson worked as an English teacher at Gresham High School. From 2005 to 2009, he was an English, math, and special education teacher at the Corbett School. From 2009 to 2014, he was an adjunct professor at ITT Technical Institute in Portland, Oregon. From 2009 to 2015, he was also an adjunct professor of reading and academic development skills at Mt. Hood Community College. Since 2014, he has been an English teacher at Reynolds High School in Troutdale, Oregon. He is also a member of the Troutdale City Council.

In November 2019, Hudson announced his candidacy for the 49th district in the Oregon House of Representatives. Hudson did not face an opponent in the Democratic primary and defeated Republican nominee Greg Johnson in the November general election.

References 

Living people
Educators from Oregon
Alumni of the University of Winchester
Portland State University alumni
People from Troutdale, Oregon
Democratic Party members of the Oregon House of Representatives
Year of birth missing (living people)